Georges-Émile Lapalme (January 14, 1907 – February 5, 1985) was a politician in Quebec, Canada and a member of the Legislative Assembly of Quebec, and leader of the Quebec Liberal Party.

Background
He was born in Montreal. He studied law at the Université de Montréal. Lapalme was married to Maria Langlois for nearly 50 years, with whom he had seven children.

Member of Parliament
Lapalme was elected to the House of Commons of Canada in the 1945 federal election and served until 1950.

Provincial politics
He resigned his federal seat to be acclaimed Leader of the Liberal Party of Quebec in 1950.  He ran for a seat to the Legislative Assembly of Quebec in the district of Joliette in the 1952 election, but was defeated by Minister of Labor and Union Nationale candidate Antonio Barrette.

Lapalme won a by-election in the district of Montréal-Outremont in 1953.  He was re-elected in the 1956 election, but under his leadership, his party lost the election against the Union Nationale. He remained a Liberal leader until 1958 and remained Leader of the Opposition in Quebec until 1960.

It was during his leadership that the Quebec Liberal Party severed its affiliation with the federal Liberal Party in 1955.

Member of the Cabinet
Lapalme won re-election in the 1960 and 1962 elections.  He never became premier, but served as deputy premier under Jean Lesage, and as Attorney-General and was the province's first Minister of Cultural Affairs.  Lapalme did not run for re-election in the 1966 election.

Elections as party leader
Lapalme lost two general elections as party leader, the 1952 election and the 1956 election.

See also
Politics of Quebec
Timeline of Quebec history
List of Quebec general elections
List of Quebec leaders of the Opposition
History of Quebec

External links

1907 births
1985 deaths
20th-century Canadian lawyers
Deputy premiers of Quebec
Lawyers from Montreal
Liberal Party of Canada MPs
Members of the House of Commons of Canada from Quebec
Politicians from Montreal
Quebec Liberal Party MNAs
Quebec political party leaders
Université de Montréal alumni
Burials at Notre Dame des Neiges Cemetery